1 William Street is a skyscraper in William Street, Brisbane, Queensland, Australia. At , it is the third-tallest building in the city and 12th-tallest building in Australia as of 2022. The modernist style office building is located in the Brisbane CBD, in close proximity to Parliament House. The building was developed for the Queensland Government as part of their plan for a renewed Government Administrative Precinct and to meet accommodation demands. It was completed in October 2016 with over 5,000 government staff moving in over six weekends.

History of the site
The site was formerly bisected by Short Street and comprised a number of different allotments and uses. Buildings occupied the area as early as 1854 and it was used for a variety of functions including; manufacturing, warehousing, shipping, housing, and electricity generation.

The Queensland Government began purchasing the properties in the 1960s as part of their Government Precinct development scheme and began demolishing the existing buildings, some dating to the 1850s. The demolition of the adjacent Bellevue Hotel and construction of 80 George Street saw the spoil from there dumped on the 1 William Street site. Short Street was closed and all of the site was amalgamated into one allotment, 1 William Street.

In 1974, the site was allocated for future government offices.

1 William Street is a  site, owned by the Queensland Government, and from 1982 until 2013 it was used as a government car park. The site encompasses a whole city block between William, Alice and Margaret Streets and Riverside Expressway.

Since 2012, 1 William Street is often colloquially referred to as the "Campbell Newman Edifice Complex" which is a reference to the building’s shape and the political arrogance of the commissioning former Newman Government and that the building is filled entirely with Queensland Government public servants.

Cultural heritage significance
The site has archaeological potential of possible cultural heritage significance. Remnants of 1850s buildings are visible above the current ground level and it is likely that significant sub-surface fabric survives.

Development
In August 2012, Expressions of Interest were called for from experienced organisations interested in bidding for the project.

In September 2012, six developers were shortlisted to develop proposals for a new high-rise tower. The shortlisted companies were Cbus, Lend Lease, Brookfield, Westfield, Leighton Properties and Grocon.

In December 2012, Cbus was announced as the developer for 1 William Street.

Design
The design includes 318 car bays.

It is intended to receive a 5-star NABERS office energy rating and a 3-star NABERS office water rating. The building is the first new commercial office building developed for government in the Brisbane CBD since the completion of the government office building at 33 Charlotte Street in 2004.

The theme and colour scheme for each floor has been dedicated to a Queensland icon or natural phenomenon.

Construction
The construction, which was undertaken by Multiplex, commenced in early 2013 and was completed in 2016. The groundbreaking of the site, attended by Tim Nicholls (Treasurer at the time) and the Jeff Seeney (Deputy Premier at the time), was held on 4 March 2013.

From 1 October 2016, nine full departments and agencies, all state government ministers, most Directors-General and more than 5,000 public servants moved to 1 William Street. Some sections from 11 other departments also shifted to 1 William Street, while other sections of these departments will move to other buildings in the inner-city. Three buildings will be demolished: the Executive Building at 100 George Street, the Executive Annex at 80 George Street and the Neville Bonner Building at 75 William Street.

Tenants

The entirety of the 1 William Street building is occupied by various departments in the Queensland Government:

 Department of Aboriginal and Torres Strait Islander Partnerships
 Department of Agriculture and Fisheries (also 41 George Street)
 Department of Communities, Child Safety and Disability Services (plus 111 George Street)
 Department of Education and Training (plus 54 Mary Street)
 Department of Energy and Water Supply
 Department of Environment and Heritage Protection (plus 400 George Street)
 Queensland Health (plus 33 Charlotte Street)
 Department of Housing and Public Works (plus 41 George Street and 60 Albert Street)
 Department of Infrastructure, Local Government and Planning
 Department of Justice and Attorney-General (plus 400 George Street)
 Department of National Parks, Sport and Racing (plus 400 George Street)
 Department of Natural Resources and Mines
 Department of Police, Fire and Emergency Services
 Public Service Commission
 Department of Science, Information Technology and Innovation (plus 140 Creek Street)
 Department of State Development, Tourism and Innovation
 Department of Transport and Main Roads (plus 61 Mary Street, 313 Adelaide Street)
 Trade and Investment Queensland
 Queensland Treasury
 Department of Tourism, Major Events, Small Business and the 2032 Summer Olympics (plus 63 George Street)

See also

List of tallest buildings in Brisbane
List of tallest buildings in Australia

References

External links

Building at the Queensland Treasury website
Building at the Woods Bagot website 
Building at the designbuild-network website
Building at The Skyscraper Center database
1 William Street at Bennett and Bennett

Neomodern architecture
Office buildings completed in 2016
Office buildings in Brisbane
Skyscrapers in Brisbane
Skyscraper office buildings in Australia
William Street, Brisbane
2016 establishments in Australia